Marcio Veloz Maggiolo (13 August 1936 – 10 April 2021) was a Dominican writer, archaeologist and anthropologist.

Biography 

Veloz Maggiolo attended the Escuela México, the Liceo Presidente Trujillo high school and the Escuela Hostos and studied philosophy and literature at the Universidad Autónoma de Santo Domingo from 1957 to 1962. In 1970 he received his doctorate in American history from the University of Madrid. He also studied journalism in Quito.

He was Deputy Secretary of State for Culture, Director of the Research Department of the Museo del Hombre Dominicano, Director of the Department of Anthropology and History and Founding Director of the Department of Extensión Cultural at the Universidad Autónoma de Santo Domingo and Director of the Museo de las Casas Reales. As ambassador of the Dominican Republic, he worked in Mexico (1965-66), Peru (1982-83) and Rome (1963-64 and 1983-85). He was a member of the Academia Dominicana de la Lengua and a corresponding member of the Academia Dominicana de Geografía, as well as a member of the American Anthropological Association and the Historical Society of Trinidad and Tobago.

Veloz Maggiolo was an extraordinarily prolific and successful writer, emerging as a poet, storyteller, novelist and playwright. He has received numerous awards, including the Premio Nacional de Novela three times (1962, 1981 and 1990) and the Premio Nacional de Literatura (1996). Some of his narrative and essay work has been translated into English, Italian, French and German. With De dónde vino la gente (1978) he was the first Dominican writer to publish a novel for children. He returned to children's literature with the novel El Jefe iba descalzo (1993) and the short stories La verdadera historia de Aladino (2007) and La iguanita azul (2012). As an essayist, Veloz Maggiolo has written on subjects such as Dominican and Caribbean culture, literature and history, linguistics, politics, archaeology, anthropology, science and the environment.
His maternal great-great-grandfather, Juan Bautista Maggiolo, was a Genovese naval captain who co-founded the Navy of the Dominican Republic with the also Genovese-born Juan Bautista Cambiaso and the Dominican Juan Alejandro Acosta.

He died on April 10, 2021, several weeks after admission to the intensive care area of the Center for Diagnostics, Advanced Medicine and Telemedicine (CEDIMAT), Santo Domingo, after being diagnosed with COVID-19 during the COVID-19 pandemic in the Dominican Republic.

References

1936 births
2021 deaths
People from Santo Domingo
Dominican Republic people of Spanish descent
Dominican Republic people of Basque descent
Dominican Republic people of Canarian descent
Dominican Republic people of Italian descent
Dominican Republic people of Portuguese descent
Dominican Republic novelists
Male novelists
Dominican Republic male poets
Dominican Republic anthropologists
People of Ligurian descent
Dominican Republic archaeologists
Deaths from the COVID-19 pandemic in the Dominican Republic
20th-century Dominican Republic poets
20th-century novelists
20th-century male writers
20th-century archaeologists
20th-century anthropologists
21st-century Dominican Republic writers
21st-century novelists
21st-century male writers